Anadelosemia texanella is a species of snout moth in the genus Anadelosemia. It was described by George Duryea Hulst in 1892. It is found in the south-eastern United States.

References

Moths described in 1892
Phycitinae
Moths of North America